Aart Staartjes (1 March 1938 – 12 January 2020) was a Dutch actor, director, television presenter and documentary maker from Amsterdam.  He was well known for his role on Sesamstraat, the Dutch co-production of Sesame Street. On this show, his character's name was Meneer Aart (Mr. Aart) and in this persona he authored a book called  (Mr. Aart: Life and work of the man who does not want to be named a friend to children).

Staartjes used to present the annual arrival of Sinterklaas in the Netherlands.

Early life 
Aart Staartjes was born in Nieuwendam, a neighbourhood of Amsterdam-Noord. He had an older brother, and a younger sister. They lived in a house on the Nieuwendammerdijk. His father, his grandfather, and an uncle of his worked in a carpentry shop located behind the house. Staartjes started his primary education at the age of eight. After that, he went to the mulo in Amsterdam, followed by the Kweekschool, a teachers' college. He dropped out of the Kweekschool in 1958, and went to the theatre school instead. He graduated in 1961.

Career 
After graduation from the Toneelschool, Staartjes performed with various companies including the Nieuw Rotterdams Toneel en Studio. Staartjes made his debut in 1961 in Meneer Topaze, based on a play written by Marcel Pagnol in the 1930s. He performed in a number of TV shows, and in 1967 starts the show Woord voor Woord for the Interkerkelijke Omroep Nederland, in which he does bible readings. He is the voice of Rocus, de vrije vogel (the free bird), for the children's show Fabeltjeskrant.

A key moment in Staartjes' career came in 1972, when broadcaster VARA asked him to develop a children's show. De Stratemakeropzeeshow, created with actors-singers Wieteke van Dort and Joost Prinsen, and the writers' collective of Willem Wilmink, Karel Eykman, and Hans Dorrestijn), is a program firmly grounded on a children's perspective, sometimes controversially so, and runs until 1974. The show didn't eschew using colloquial language; "Poop and Pee Minuet", for instance, was criticized in the tabloid De Telegraaf. This show and its successor were hailed as groundbreaking in offering the point of view of children and in popularizing poetry for children to a wide audience, in a country which was until then quite conservative but had recently seen a wave of children's books that tackled real-life issues, including divorce, sexual violence, drug use. After the show ended in 1974, he performed in and co-directed De film van ome Willem, starring Edwin Rutten, a show that ran until 1989.

He provided the voice of Bernard in the Dutch dub of The Rescuers, as well as the additional voices of Deacon Owl and Deadeye the Rabbit.

With van Dort and Prinsen, with whom he made the Stratemakeropzeeshow, he creates J.J. de Bom voorheen De Kindervriend, in 1979. He plays the role of Hein Gatje, a postman who delivers letters in which children write of their problems and predicaments, which are then tackled in the show. The three teamed up again with writers Wilmink, Eykman, and Dorrestijn and while the show was very popular, the VARA pulled it after 32 episodes.

In 1984, Aart Staartjes started to play the role of Mr. Aart in Sesamstraat, the Dutch co-production of Sesame Street. Mr. Aart is a rather grumpy elderly man who always has something to complain about, especially about the animal characters Pino, Tommie and Ieniemienie. This character was added because critics felt Sesamstraat was too saccharine. After the death in 1999 of actor-singer Lex Goudsmit, who played the resident "grandfather" character on the show, Mr. Aart took that over. He played Mr. Aart until 2018, when the NOS decided to stop making the show and show only re-runs. Staartjes also starred in Het Klokhuis, a show started in 1988 and made for children who had outgrown Sesamstraat; his character was Professor Doctor Fetze Alsvanouds, a distracted professor from the University of Harderwijk (a real university, which was closed in 1811). Staartjes developed the show with Ben Klokman. He also welcomed Sinterklaas at his annual arrival in the Netherlands, for almost 20 years until 2001. By this time he had cut down on acting, though he still performed occasionally —in 2002 in the TV drama Mevrouw de minister, and in 2006 as circus director Willy Waltz in the series Waltz.

Personal life and death 
Staartjes was 22 years old when his first child was born. He divorced his first wife sixteen years later. He later married a woman named Hanna.

On 10 January 2020, Staartjes was involved in a collision between a car and his quadricycle in Leeuwarden. He was taken to the hospital in critical condition and died two days later. He was 81 years old.

Filmography (selection) 
De FabeltjesKrant (TV series), voice of Rocus de Vrije Vogel (1969–72)
De Stratemakeropzeeshow (TV series), starring as Stratemaker-op-zee, abbreviated "Straat"
Oorlogswinter (Winter in Wartime) (1975 TV mini-series), Director 
Pinkeltje (1978 film), starring as Pinkeltje (Fingerling)
De Film van Ome Willem (TV series) 
J.J. de Bom, voorheen de Kindervriend (TV series), as Hein Gatje (1979–81)
Het Klokhuis (TV series) 1988-, among others as Fetze Als-vanouds
Waltz (TV mini?series) 2006, starring as Willy Waltz

References

External links 

1938 births
2020 deaths
Male actors from Amsterdam
Dutch male television actors
Dutch children's television presenters
Sinterklaas
Road incident deaths in the Netherlands